Baldwin Glacier is a broad glacier, flowing generally eastward from a large icefalls at the escarpment west of Mount Rosenwald and entering Shackleton Glacier south of Mount Heekin. It was discovered and photographed by U.S. Navy Operation Highjump (1946–47) on the flights of February 16, 1947, and named by the Advisory Committee on Antarctic Names for Sergeant George E. Baldwin, United States Marine Corps, photographer on Flight 8A.

See also
 List of glaciers in the Antarctic
 Glaciology

References
 

Glaciers of Dufek Coast